Prineha Narang (born September 27, 1989) is an Indian-American Associate Professor of Physical Sciences, Chemistry and Biochemistry and Howard Reiss Chair at the University of California, Los Angeles (UCLA). Before moving to UCLA, she was first an Environmental Fellow at Harvard University Center for the Environment and then an Assistant Professor in the John A. Paulson School of Engineering and Applied Sciences at Harvard University. Prof. Narang’s work has been recognized internationally by many awards and a variety of special designations, including the Mildred Dresselhaus Prize, the 2021 IUPAP Young Scientist Prize in Computational Physics, a Friedrich Wilhelm Bessel Research Award (Bessel Prize) from the Alexander von Humboldt Foundation, and a Max Planck Sabbatical Award from the Max Planck Society. Narang also received a National Science Foundation CAREER Award in 2020, was named a Moore Inventor Fellow by the Gordon and Betty Moore Foundation for the development for a fundamentally new strategy for single molecule sensing and environmental toxin metrology using picoscale quantum sensors, CIFAR Azrieli Global Scholar by the Canadian Institute for Advanced Research, and a Top Innovator by MIT Tech Review (MIT TR35).

She was selected as a Moore Inventor Fellow,  and as one of Forbes 30 Under 30. Narang is the founder and Chief Technology Officer of Aliro, a quantum network platform company. Since 2022, she has been at UCLA as the Howard Reiss Development Chair leading efforts at the intersection of computational science, condensed matter theory, quantum photonics, and quantum information science. Her upcoming move was recently covered by Inside Quantum Technology, profiled by California Institute of Technology (Caltech) and UCLA.

Early life and education 
Narang earned her Bachelor's degree in materials science at Drexel University, where she worked under the supervision of Yury Gogotsi on nanomaterial design. She received an M.S. and Ph.D. in Applied Physics from the California Institute of Technology (Caltech) working with Harry A. Atwater on light-matter interactions, and William A. Goddard, III, a pioneer of theoretical and computational chemistry. In particular, Narang considered quantum plasmonics and nitride materials for optoelectronics devices. At Caltech, Narang was both a Resnick Fellow, supported by the Resnick Sustainability Institute, and a NSF Graduate Research Fellow.

Research and career 
Narang joined Harvard University as a Ziff Environmental Fellow in the Harvard University Center for the Environment. Narang is interested in the interaction of quantum materials with electromagnetic radiation. In 2016, Narang joined Massachusetts Institute of Technology and worked as a Research Scholar at MIT with Marin Soljacic and John Joannopolous in condensed matter theory, where she worked on the development of computation models to predict quantum interactions. In particular, Narang looks to better understand excited state and non-equilibrium phenomena. These findings are used to inform the design of new materials and devices. Narang is interested in the bottom-up design of optimised materials, which requires atom-by-atom engineering.

In 2017, Narang was appointed to the faculty of the Harvard John A. Paulson School of Engineering and Applied Sciences. She designed a quantum sensing device that can detect and identify isolated molecules. Beyond light-matter interactions, Narang has pioneered development of solid-state quantum repeaters, nanoscale devices that can store quantum information and convert it into photons by predicting color centers in 2D and 3D materials. A precise understanding of light-matter interactions might allow the design of novel catalytic systems, where energy transfer pathways and the energetic landscape of chemical reactions can be manipulated through the coupling of light and matter.

As an assistant professor of computational materials science at Harvard, Narang studied the optical, thermal, and electronic behavior of materials at the nanoscale to enable a new generation of technologies. Since 2022, her interdisciplinary group, NarangLab, moved to UCLA, where she and her team continue to explore topics at the intersection of computational science, condensed matter theory, quantum photonics, and quantum information science. Her upcoming move was recently covered by Inside Quantum Technology. Narang’s work builds on decades of advances in nanoscience that have brought the field closer to a long-held goal: the ability to engineer materials atom by atom.

Narang is the founder and Chief Technology Officer of Aliro, a quantum network platform company. The company has developed Q.compute, a platform to support developers in identifying the correct quantum computation system for a given application, and Q.network, that aids the design of efficient quantum networks.

Narang holds leadership roles in various Department of Energy, Department of Defense and National Science Foundation centers, and her continued service to the community includes Chairing the Materials Research Society (MRS) Spring Meeting (2022)  and the MRS-Kavli Foundation Future of Materials Workshop: Computational Materials Science (2021), as an Associate Editor for ACS Nano, and most recently a leadership role in APS’ Division of Materials Physics. In 2021 she helped organize a National Academies of Sciences, Engineering, and Medicine (NASEM) workshop and report on "Quantum Science Concepts in Enhancing Sensing and Imaging Technologies: Applications for Biology—A Workshop", chaired by Taekjip Ha.

Alongside her research, Narang developed an undergraduate program in quantum engineering. She has also stressed the importance of balancing work with other activities in her mentorship and research.

Awards and honors 
 2017 Forbes 30 Under 30
 2018 World Economic Forum Young Global Leaders
 2018 MIT Technology Review TR35 Innovator
 2018 CIFAR Azrieli Global Scholar
 2018 Gordon and Betty Moore Foundation Moore Inventor Fellow
 2020 National Science Foundation CAREER Award
2021 IUPAP Young Scientist Prize in Computational Physics for her “pioneering achievements in computational nanophotonics, quantum plasmonics and ab initio descriptions of ultrafast dynamics in quantum materials”
2021 Max Planck Sabbatical Award from the Max Planck Society
2021 Friedrich Wilhelm Bessel Research Award (Bessel Award) from the Alexander von Humboldt Foundation
2021 Mildred Dresselhaus Prize for her “outstanding contributions to the field of quantum science and technology”.
2022 Outstanding Early Career Investigator Award  from the Materials Research Society. Narang was selected “for critical advances in the understanding of materials physics, optical sciences and topology for the prediction and design of quantum materials.”

Selected publications 

 
 
 
Flick, J., and Narang, P. (2018). "Cavity-correlated electron-nuclear dynamics from first principles." Physical Review Letters, 121 (11), 113002. 
Coulter, J., Sundararaman, R., and Narang, P. (2018). "Microscopic origins of hydro-dynamic transport in the type-II Weyl semimetal WP2". Physical Review B, 98 (11), 115130
Rivera, N., Flick, J., and Narang, P. (2019). "Variational theory of non-relativistic quantum electrodynamics." Physical Review Letters, 122 (19), 193603
"Quantum Information and Algorithms for Correlated Quantum Matter"Kade Head-Marsden, Johannes Flick, Christopher J. Ciccarino, and Prineha Narang Cite this: Chem. Rev. 2021, 121, 5, 3061–3120 
Prineha Narang, Christina A. C. Garcia & Claudia Felser, "The topology of electronic band structures Nature Materials volume 20", pages 293–300 (2021) (link)
Varnavides, G., Jermyn, A.S., Anikeeva, P., Felser, C., & Narang, P. (2020). "Electron hydrodynamics in anisotropic materials. Nature Communications" 11, 4710.
Vool, U., Hamo, A., Varnavides, G., Wang, Y., Zhou, T.X., Kumar, N., Dovzhenko, Y., Qiu, Z., Garcia, C.A.C., Pierce, A.T., Gooth, J., Anikeeva, P., Felser, C., Narang, P. & Yacoby, A. (2021). "Imaging phonon-mediated hydrodynamic flow in WTe2 with cryogenic quantum magnetometry." Nature Physics.

References 

1989 births
Drexel University alumni
California Institute of Technology alumni
Women in optics
Living people
21st-century American engineers
American women scientists
Optical engineers
American materials scientists